Video production is the process of producing video content for video. It is the equivalent of filmmaking, but with video recorded either as analog signals on videotape, digitally in video tape or as computer files stored on optical discs, hard drives, SSDs, magnetic tape or memory cards instead of film stock. There are three stages of video production: pre-production, production (also known as principal photography), and post-production. Pre-production involves all of the planning aspects of the video production process before filming begins. This includes scriptwriting, scheduling, logistics, and other administrative duties. Production is the phase of video production which captures the video content (electronic moving images) and involves filming the subject(s) of the video. Post-production is the action of selectively combining those video clips through video editing into a finished product that tells a story or communicates a message in either a live event setting (live production), or after an event has occurred (post-production).

Currently, the majority of video content is captured through electronic media like an SD card for consumer grade cameras, or on solid state storage and flash storage for professional grade cameras. Video content that is distributed digitally on the internet often appears in common formats  such as the MPEG container format (.mpeg, .mpg, .mp4), QuickTime (.mov), Audio Video Interleave (.avi), Windows Media Video (.wmv), and DivX (.avi, .divx).

Types of videos
There are many different types of video production. The most common include film and TV production, television commercials,  internet commercials, corporate videos, product videos, customer testimonial videos, marketing videos, event videos, wedding videos. The term "Video Production" is reserved only for content creation that is taken through all phases of production (Pre-production, Production, and Post-production) and created with a specific audience in mind. A person filming a concert, or their child's band recital with a smartphone or video camera for the sole purpose of capturing the memory would fall under the category of "home movies" not video production.

Production scale
Production scale is determined by crew size and not the location of the production, or the type of content captured. Crew size in most cases will determine a project's quality and is not a limitation of what kind of content can be captured. There are feature films that have been captured by a crew of just 2 people, and corporate videos that leverage teams of 10 or more.

Some examples of production scale include:
A solo camera operator with a professional video camera in a single-camera setup (aka a "one-man band").
A small crew of 2 people, one for operating the camera and one for capturing audio. 
A multiple-camera setup shoot with multiple camera operators and a small crew with support staff.
A larger scale production with a crew of 5 or more people and a trailer or production truck

Shooting styles and techniques

The same shooting styles used in filmmaking can also be used in video production. There is not a singular type of style that is used for every kind of video content captured. Instead, style changes depending on the type of video being created, and the desired tone and message of the video.

Tripods for a stable shots (also called a locked down shot)
Hand-held for a more energetic and jittery feel - often used to depict natural movement
Non-leveled camera angles see Dutch angle
Whip pan and Whip zoom
Vertical motion shots using a jib or crane often in the beginning or ends of videos/
Steadicam for smooth movement and tracking shots at slower speeds such as moving through rooms or following actors and action.
3-axis stabilized gimbal for smooth motion shots at any speed. The gimbal compensates for the camera operators movements much like a steadicam but through electronic motors instead of through inertia. The gimbal allows for operators to move much more freely than a steadicam because of the considerably smaller amount of weight used in a gimbal setup. Gimbals can access many places that would be impossible for a steadicam because of this added portability.

Television broadcast

Two styles of producing video are ENG (Electronic news-gathering) and EFP (Electronic field production).

Television broadcast productions include television commercials, infomercials, newscasts, variety shows, game shows, live television documentaries, news magazines, sitcoms, and reality shows, among others.

Shows can be distributed by broadcast syndication. SP video production was the broadcast television standard from the early 1980s up until the beginning of the 21st century, when many television stations began using digital media to shoot, transmit, and store High-definition (HD) footage.

Video production for distance education 
Video production for distance education is the process of capturing, editing, and presenting educational material specifically for use in on-line education. Teachers integrate best practice teaching techniques to create scripts, organize content, capture video footage, edit footage using computer based video editing software to deliver final educational material over the Internet. It differs from other types of video production in at least three ways:

It augments traditional teaching tools used in on-line educational programs.
It may incorporate motion video with sound, computer animations, stills, and other digital media.
Capture of content may include use of cell phone integrated cameras and extend to commercial high-definition Broadcast quality cameras.

The primary purpose of using video in distance education is to improve understanding and comprehension in a synchronous or asynchronous manner.

Webcasting is also being used in education for distance learning projects; one innovative use was the DiveLive programs.

For example, Nautilus Productions details an exploration of a notable shipwreck: "In the fall of 2000 Rick Allen's Nautilus Productions co-produced with Bill Lovin of Marine Grafics a groundbreaking, week long live internet broadcast known as QAR DiveLive from the Blackbeard wreck site. For the first time ever, live video and audio was broadcast from an underwater archaeological site to the World Wide Web. Students were able to watch the underwater archaeology in real time and ask questions of the scientists exploring the shipwreck. The twice-daily live distance learning programs reached an estimated 1600 students from as far away as Canada during the five days of broadcasting. In October of 2001 Allen and Lovin again co-produced QAR DiveLive 2001. This time the interactive webcasts from the seafloor and conservation laboratories of the Queen Anne's Revenge Shipwreck Project reached over 3600 students and another 2700 remote viewers from fifteen states and 2 countries during the five days of   broadcasts."

Internet video production

Increasing internet speeds, the transition to digital from physical formats such as tape to file-based media and the availability of cloud-based video services has increased use of the internet to provision services previously delivered on-premise in the context of commercial content creation for example video editing.  In some cases the lower costs of equivalent services in the cloud has driven adoption and in others the greater scope for collaboration and time savings.

Many web sites include videos. Although not necessarily produced online, many video production tools allow the production of videos without actually using a physical camera. An example of this is using the YouTube video editor to create a video using pre-existing video content that is held on the platform under Creative Commons license.

Video content is being used in an ever-growing range of contexts, including testimonial videos, web presenter videos, help section videos, interviews, parodies, product demonstrations, training videos, and thank you videos.

Marketing videos are made on the basis of the campaign target. Explainer videos are used for explaining a product, commercial videos for introducing a company, sales videos for selling a product, and social media videos for brand awareness.

Individual Internet marketing videos are primarily produced in-house and by small media agencies, while a large volume of videos are produced by big media companies, crowdsourced production marketplaces, or in scalable video production platforms.

Most Internet marketing videos serve the purpose of interacting with the audience. The two main types of internet marketing videos are transactional videos, which aim to sell a product to a customer, and reference videos, which are designed to keep the customer on the site.

Light art video production

Videos are produced for different areas. The luminous experience of electricity was very successful at the Vivid Festival in 2013, the same year the German group Kraftwerk performed there. A few years later, they themselves projected a light show in combination with their hits on Museum_Kunstpalast in Düsseldorf. Light art appears in music videos too, such as the one by artist Marc Engelhard.

See also
B-roll
List of video topics
Television studies

References

External links

Broadcast engineering
Film and video technology
Television terminology

Articles containing video clips